Mad Green Boys is official supporting group of Jeonbuk Hyundai Motors. It usually known as M.G.B. and it is one of the biggest supporting group in K League Classic.

It was selected as The Most Terrifying Supporters in 2016 by K Leaguers.

References

Jeonbuk Hyundai Motors
South Korean football supporters' associations